In number theory, a perfect digit-to-digit invariant (PDDI; also known as a Munchausen number) is a natural number in a given number base  that is equal to the sum of its digits each raised to the power of itself. An example in base 10 is 3435, because . The term "Munchausen number" was coined by Dutch mathematician and software engineer Daan van Berkel in 2009, as this evokes the story of Baron Munchausen raising himself up by his own ponytail because each digit is raised to the power of itself.

Definition 
(As 00 is usually undefined, there are typically two conventions used, one where it is taken to be equal to one, and another where it is taken to be equal to zero.) A natural number  is defined to be a perfect digit-to-digit invariant in base b if . For example, the number 3435 is a perfect digit-to-digit invariant in base 10 because . 

 for all , and thus 1 is a trivial perfect digit-to-digit invariant in all bases, and all other perfect digit-to-digit invariants are nontrivial.

This is because all natural numbers of base  with  digits satisfy . However, when , then , so any  will satisfy  until . This means also that there are a finite number of perfect digit-to-digit invariant and cycles for any given base .

Perfect digit-to-digit invariants and cycles of Fb for specific b
All numbers are represented in base .

Convention 00 = 1

Convention 00 = 0

Programming examples

The following program in Python determines whether an integer number is a Munchausen Number / Perfect Digit to Digit Invariant or not, following the convention .
num = int(input("Enter number:"))
temp = num
s = 0.0
while num > 0:
     digit = num % 10
     num //= 10
     s+= pow(digit, digit)
     
if s == temp:
    print("Munchausen Number")
else:
    print("Not Munchausen Number")

The examples below implements the perfect digit-to-digit invariant function described in the definition above to search for perfect digit-to-digit invariants and cycles in Python for the two conventions.

Convention 00 = 1 
def pddif(x: int, b: int) -> int:
    total = 0
    while x > 0:
        total = total + pow(x % b, x % b)
        x = x // b
    return total

def pddif_cycle(x: int, b: int) -> list[int]:
    seen = []
    while x not in seen:
        seen.append(x)
        x = pddif(x, b)
    cycle = []
    while x not in cycle:
        cycle.append(x)
        x = pddif(x, b)
    return cycle

Convention 00 = 0 
def pddif(x: int, b: int) -> int:
    total = 0
    while x > 0:
        if x % b > 0:
            total = total + pow(x % b, x % b)
        x = x // b
    return total

def pddif_cycle(x: int, b: int) -> list[int]:
    seen = []
    while x not in seen:
        seen.append(x)
        x = pddif(x, b)
    cycle = []
    while x not in cycle:
        cycle.append(x)
        x = pddif(x, b)
    return cycle

See also
 Arithmetic dynamics
 Dudeney number
 Factorion
 Happy number
 Kaprekar's constant
 Kaprekar number
 Meertens number
 Narcissistic number
 Perfect digital invariant
 Sum-product number

References

External links
 

Arithmetic dynamics
Base-dependent integer sequences
Articles with example Python (programming language) code